Giuseppe James "Joe" Iaciofano (born 10 September 1998) is an English professional footballer who plays as a forward for National League South club Oxford City.

Early life
Born in Northampton, Iaciofano attended Northampton School for Boys.

Club career

Northampton Town
Iaciofano joined the Northampton Town academy in November 2009. He made his senior debut for the club as a 75th-minute substitute replacing fellow countryman Alex Revell in a 1–1 draw with West Ham United U23s in the EFL Trophy on 8 November 2016. Then on 13 December, he was handed an FA Cup debut (in Northampton's 1–0 away defeat to Stourbridge). Iaciofano entered the field in the 91st-minute, coming on in place of Jak McCourt. He came on in stoppage time to make his senior league debut in a 0–1 defeat away to Sheffield United on 31 December 2016. After returning from his work experience loan at neighbouring Corby Town; Iaciofano signed a professional contract with Northampton Town in the summer of 2017.

On 6 May 2019, Iaciofano was told by Northampton that they would not be extending his contract.

Corby Town (work experience)
On 3 February 2017, Iaciofano joined semi-professional Northamptonshire-based side Corby Town of the Northern Premier League on a work experience basis to gain first-team experience.

Chesham United (loan)
Having signed his first professional deal with Northampton Town in summer 2017, Iaciofano was loaned to semi-professional Buckinghamshire-based side Chesham United of the Southern League Premier Division.

Mansfield (loan)
Iaciofano was loaned to Northern Premier League club AFC Mansfield in November 2018. On 4 January 2019, his loan was extended for a further month.

Banbury United (loan)
Iaciofano was loaned to Southern Premier Division Central club Banbury United on 26 February 2019. Iaciofano made his first appearance in a 1–1 draw against Redditch United and he scored his first goal in a 2–1 win over Needham Market.

He was one of 8 players released by Northampton at the end of the 2018–19 season; a further 3 were placed for sale.

St Albans City
On 12 July 2019, Iaciofano joined National League South club St Albans City. He made his first appearance against Chippenham Town. On 6 August 2019, he scored his first goal for the Saints in a 1–1 draw against Dartford.

Havant & Waterlooville
After being joint winner of the Golden Boot in the 2019–20 season, Iaciofano joined Havant & Waterlooville.

Oxford City
In June 2021, Iaciofano joined National League South side Oxford City, after fellow striker James Roberts had gone the opposite direction.

Career statistics

References

External links
 Profile on Northampton Town website
 
 Official Twitter account

1998 births
Living people
Footballers from Northampton
English footballers
English people of Italian descent
People educated at Northampton School for Boys
Association football forwards
Northampton Town F.C. players
Corby Town F.C. players
Chesham United F.C. players
Brackley Town F.C. players
A.F.C. Mansfield players
Banbury United F.C. players
St Albans City F.C. players
Havant & Waterlooville F.C. players
Oxford City F.C. players
Northern Premier League players
Southern Football League players
English Football League players
National League (English football) players